The 2003 Taça de Portugal Final was the final match of the 2002–03 Taça de Portugal, the 63rd season of the Taça de Portugal, the premier Portuguese football cup competition organized by the Portuguese Football Federation (FPF). The match was played on 15 June 2003 at the Estádio Nacional in Oeiras, and opposed two Primeira Liga sides: Porto and União de Leiria. Porto defeated União de Leiria 1–0, thanks to a second half strike from Brazilian striker Derlei. Porto's cup victory would give them a twelfth Taça de Portugal, and seal the treble after winning the Primeira Liga and the UEFA Cup a few weeks before the cup final.

In Portugal, the final was televised live on TVI and Sport TV. As Porto claimed both league and cup double in the same season, cup runners-up União de Leiria faced their cup final opponents in the 2003 Supertaça Cândido de Oliveira at the Estádio D. Afonso Henriques in Guimarães.

Match

Details

References

2003
2002–03 in Portuguese football
FC Porto matches
U.D. Leiria matches